Babylon is a 2022 American epic period black comedy-drama film written and directed by Damien Chazelle. It features an ensemble cast including Brad Pitt, Margot Robbie, Diego Calva, Jean Smart, Jovan Adepo, and Li Jun Li. It chronicles the rise and fall of multiple characters during Hollywood's transition from silent to sound films in the late 1920s.

Chazelle began developing the film in July 2019, with Lionsgate Films as the frontrunner to acquire the project. It was announced that Paramount Pictures had acquired worldwide rights in November 2019. Much of the main cast joined the project between January 2020 and August 2021, and filming took place in Los Angeles from July to October 2021.

Babylon premiered at the Samuel Goldwyn Theater in Los Angeles on November 14, 2022, and was released in the United States on December 23. The film polarized critics, who generally praised its cinematography, score, editing, production design, lead performances and themes, but were sharply divided on its graphic content and runtime. It was a box-office bomb, grossing $63 million against a production budget of $78–80 million. The film received five nominations at the 80th Golden Globe Awards (including Best Motion Picture – Musical or Comedy, winning Best Original Score), nine nominations at the 28th Critics' Choice Awards (including Best Picture), three nominations at the 76th British Academy Film Awards, and three nominations at the 95th Academy Awards.

Plot

In 1926 Los Angeles, Mexican immigrant Manuel "Manny" Torres helps transport an elephant to a debauched, drug-fueled bacchanal at a Kinoscope Studios executive's mansion. He quickly becomes smitten with Nellie LaRoy, a brash, ambitious self-declared "star" from New Jersey. As they snort cocaine, Manny reveals his wish to be part of something bigger. While the elephant walks through, distracting partygoers, Manny helps carry away young actress Jane Thornton, who overdosed on drugs during a urolagniac act with sizable actor Orville Pickwick.

Also attending are Chinese-American lesbian cabaret singer Lady Fay Zhu and African-American jazz trumpeter Sidney Palmer. The flamboyantly-dancing Nellie is spotted and swiftly recruited to replace Jane in a Kinoscope film; during filming, she crudely upstages the star. Manny meets and befriends Jack Conrad, a benevolent but troubled, oft-married film star, and drives home the drunken Jack, who helps Manny secure assistant jobs at Kinoscope (like finding Otto Von Strassberger a new camera to film Jack in an outdoors love scene before nightfall); Manny climbs the studio system's ranks.

Nellie quickly becomes an "it girl" covered by gossip columnist Elinor St. John, who also follows Jack's career. As sound film displaces silents in the late-1920s, Manny skillfully adapts to technical changes, eventually attaining directorial jobs. Nellie struggles to navigate sound film's demands, and increases her drug use and reckless gambling, tarnishing her reputation despite Manny's assistance.

Nellie, shown to have an institutionalized mother, eggs on her drunken father (and inept business-manager) Robert to publicly fight a rattlesnake during a party; he passes out. Nellie fights the snake, which bites her neck; Fay kills it and sucks out the venom. Nellie passionately kisses her. 

By 1932, Jack begins to sense that his popularity has waned, but still works in low-budget Metro-Goldwyn-Mayer films. Meanwhile, Sidney has secured his own musical film and orchestra. 

As Hollywood becomes less libertine, executives tell Manny to fire Fay, a Kinoscope title writer, because of her perceived lesbian affair with Nellie. While practicing lines with new wife Estelle, Jack is devastated to learn his longtime friend/producer, George Munn, has committed suicide. 

Elinor and Manny attempt to revamp Nellie's image and ingratiate her into Hollywood's high society, but at a party with William Randolph Hearst and Marion Davies, Nellie lashes out against upper-class snobbery, vomiting on Hearst.

Jack finds Elinor's cover story about his declining popularity and confronts her; she explains that although his star has faded, he will be immortalized on film. Sidney is offended when studio executives convince Manny to request he don blackface for Southern audiences. Upon completion, Sidney leaves Kinoscope. 

Meanwhile, eccentric gangster James McKay threatens Nellie's life over her massive gambling debts. Manny initially rejects her pleas for help, but later secures funds from on-set drug-pusher/aspiring actor "The Count", and visits James with him to pay off Nellie's debt. Manny panics upon learning the money is fake, made by his own prop-maker. James invites the men to a subterranean gathering-space for animal-abusing debauched parties, raving about potential film ideas. When James realizes the cash is fake, he attempts to kill them, but they narrowly escape, killing James' henchman Wilson.

Jack encounters Fay at a hotel party; she reveals her departure for Europe and Pathé. Afterwards, in his hotel room, a despondent Jack fatally shoots himself in the head.

Manny asks Nellie to flee with him to Mexico, marry, and start a new life. She resists, but eventually agrees. However, James' associate tracks Manny down, killing The Count and his roommate but sparing Manny's life if Manny leaves Los Angeles. Meanwhile, Nellie reneges on her decision and dances away into the night.

A montage reveals newspaper clippings detailing Nellie being found dead in a hotel room at 34, and Elinor's death at age 76.

In 1952, Manny returns to California with his wife Silvia and young daughter, having fled to New York City and established a radio shop. He shows them the Kinoscope Studios entrance, but visits a nearby cinema alone to see Singin' in the Rain; the film's depiction of the industry's transition from silents to talkies moves him to tears. A century-spanning series of vignettes from numerous films follows. As the focus returns to Singin' in the Rain, Manny smiles.

Cast

Production

Development

It was announced in July 2019 that Damien Chazelle had set his next project following First Man (2018) as a period drama set in the Golden Age of Hollywood. Lionsgate Films was the frontrunner to acquire the project after distributing Chazelle's La La Land (2016), with Emma Stone (also having worked on La La Land) and Brad Pitt in the mix to star. In November, Paramount Pictures acquired worldwide rights to the project, with Stone and Pitt still circling roles. Pitt confirmed his involvement in January 2020, describing the film as being set when the silent film era transitioned into sound. He was set to play a character modeled on actor-director John Gilbert.

By December 2020, Margot Robbie was in early negotiations to replace Stone, who exited the film due to scheduling conflicts, and Li Jun Li was also cast. Robbie was confirmed in March 2021, with Jovan Adepo and Diego Calva also joining.

In June, Katherine Waterston, Max Minghella, Flea, Samara Weaving, Rory Scovel, Lukas Haas, Eric Roberts, P.J. Byrne, Damon Gupton, Olivia Wilde, Spike Jonze, Phoebe Tonkin, and Tobey Maguire (who is also an executive producer on the film) joined the cast. In July, Jean Smart joined the cast, with Chloe Fineman, Jeff Garlin, Telvin Griffin, and Troy Metcalf joining the cast the following month.

Filming
Filming was originally set to take place in California in mid-2020 but was postponed due to the COVID-19 pandemic. Filming began on July 1, 2021, and wrapped on October 21, 2021.  Shea's Castle was used for the exterior shots of the mansion in the opening party scene, with interior shots being filmed inside the Ace Hotel Los Angeles.  The movie ranch, Blue Sky Ranch, serves as Kinescope Studios in the film.

Music

Justin Hurwitz, a frequent collaborator of Chazelle, composed the film's score. Two tracks from the score, "Call Me Manny" and "Voodoo Mama," were released digitally on November 10, 2022, the latter track being used to underscore the film's first trailer. The soundtrack album was released by Interscope Records on December 9, 2022.

Themes and interpretations 
In an essay for /Film, Robert Daniels asserts that Babylon is essentially a story of identity and assimilation in early Hollywood. While noting the similarities it shares with films such as The Last Black Man in San Francisco (2019),  Bamboozled (2000), and Medicine for Melancholy (2008), Daniels focuses on character Manuel "Manny" Torres and his rise into the Hollywood studio system: "In the process, Manuel cuts off ties with his Mexican roots—though they live in Los Angeles, he never visits his family—he Americanizes his name to Manny, and at a party thrown by William Randolph Hearst, he presents himself as a Spaniard. Manuel becomes intoxicated by his proximity to the white capitalistic greed that governs Hollywood (and partly the American dream of upward mobility), causing him to traverse a tenuous betweenness of identity." Daniels writes that Manny's erasure of his identity is sparked by his fantasy romance with Nellie LaRoy—who represents what he loves about Hollywood: "An indefinable magical quality, upward mobility, picturesque happiness, and the ability to permanently define yourself." Daniels also adds that, while climbing the social ladder, Manny contributed to the mythology of Hollywood, recalling one scene where he expeditiously retrieved a camera for a large, destructive set and a picturesque scene is shot without future film audiences' knowledge of its production, and another scene where Manny pressures Black trumpeter Sidney Palmer to don blackface during the filming of a jazz short, so that the lighting on the set doesn’t lighten his complexion in the final product.

Douglas Laman of Collider observed that Babylon functions as a rumination on how human beings try to outrun and ignore their innate mortality, pointing to the various nonchalant depictions of death (such as a newscaster's casual account of the suicide of a Jack Conrad fangirl) as an especially discernible example of this thematic element. Laman also pointed to a key scene in the middle of Babylon concerning Conrad briefly being overwhelmed by the death of his friend George Munn before returning to his default unflappable persona to be another key instance of the feature functioning as a tragic meditation on people trying to evade the inevitable presence of death.

Release
Babylon was first screened for critics and industry on November 14, 2022, at the Samuel Goldwyn Theater in Los Angeles and in New York City the following day. It was released on December 23, 2022. The film was initially scheduled for a December 25, 2021, limited release and a January 7, 2022, wide release, but was later delayed by an entire year, with a December 25, 2022, limited release, and a January 6, 2023, wide release, due to the COVID-19 pandemic. In October, the film was moved two days earlier to the current date and set for a solely wide release instead.

The film was released on VOD platforms on January 31, 2023, and on Paramount+ on February 21, 2023. It will be released on Blu-ray, DVD and 4K UHD a month later on March 21, 2023.

Marketing
The first red-banded trailer for Babylon premiered on September 12, 2022, at the 2022 Toronto International Film Festival during a Q&A event with Chazelle and TIFF CEO Cameron Bailey. It was released to the public the following day, alongside character posters of the main cast. Noting its uncensored nudity, profanity and drug use, several publications compared the trailer's atmosphere to that of films such as The Wolf of Wall Street (2013) and The Great Gatsby (2013), which star Robbie and Maguire, respectively. A featurette about the making of the film was released on November 21, 2022. The second and final trailer for the film and its theatrical release poster were released on November 28, 2022.

As Maggie Dela Paz notes at ComingSoon.net, "a brand new behind-the scenes featurette ...highlight[ing] Chazelle’s ensemble cast of A-list stars and familiar supporting actors[, and] also featur[ing] commentary from the Oscar-nominated director as he talks about the challenge of handling this massive cast" was released on December 29, 2022.

Reception

Box office
Babylon grossed $15.4 million in the United States and Canada, and $48 million in other territories, for a worldwide total of $63.4 million.

In the United States and Canada, Babylon was released alongside Whitney Houston: I Wanna Dance with Somebody, and was initially projected to gross $12–15 million from 3,342 theaters over its four-day opening weekend. The film made $1.5 million on its first day (including Thursday-night previews) and went on to debut to just $3.5 million in its opening weekend (and a total of $5.3 million over the four days), finishing fourth at the box office. Deadline cited the general public's declining interest in prestige films, the threat of a tripledemic surge in COVID-19 and flu cases, and the nationwide impact of Winter Storm Elliott as reasons for lower-than-expected theater attendance. The outlet also noted that with a combined production and promotion budget of around $160 million, Babylon will have to gross $250 million worldwide in order to break-even. In its sophomore weekend the film made $2.6 million (a drop of 27.5%), finishing in fifth. 

In Europe, the film took $3.3 million on its opening weekend in France and $1.6 million (£1.3 million) in the United Kingdom, coming second and third respectively at the box office.

Critical response 
According to IndieWire and The Hollywood Reporter, as well as the opinion of Chazelle himself, reception to the film was "polarized". On the review aggregator website Rotten Tomatoes, Babylon holds an approval rating of 56% based on 341 reviews, with an average rating of 6.4/10. The site's critics consensus reads: "Babylons overwhelming muchness is exhausting, but much like the industry it honors, its well-acted, well-crafted glitz and glamour can often be an effective distraction." On Metacritic, the film has a weighted average score of 60 out of 100, based on 63 critics, indicating "mixed or average reviews". Audiences polled by CinemaScore gave the film an average grade of "C+" on an A+ to F scale, while PostTrak reported 74% of audience members gave the film a positive score, with 47% saying they would definitely recommend it.

In his review for the San Francisco Chronicle, Mick LaSalle praised Chazelle's ambition and direction, writing that "Babylon is what movie love really looks like." THR's David Rooney described it as a "syncopated concentration of hedonistic revelry", praising the cast performances, score, cinematography, costume and production design, but criticizing the screenplay and direction—ultimately concluding "it’s hard to imagine the overstuffed yet insubstantial Babylon finding its way into many screen-classic montages". Conversely, Pete Hammond of Deadline wrote that "it is guaranteed to be a movie that will stay in your head", commending the direction, production design, and cast performances.

In his review for The Guardian, Peter Bradshaw assigned the film three stars out of five, applauding the performances of Robbie and Pitt for elevating "a story in no hurry to engage with the true-life nastiness of its era". Writing for Vanity Fair, Richard Lawson concurred with Bradshaw's sentiment, stating: "These are little islands in a sea of mannered chaos, but it begins to feel, as Babylon stretches out across three hours and eight minutes, that Chazelle has no clear idea where all of this is going." In a scathing review for Time, Stephanie Zacharek highlighted Jun Li's performance, but criticized Chazelle's screenplay and direction, summarizing: "Babylon is a manic sprawl that only pretends to celebrate cinema. It’s really about prurience, dumb sensation, self-congratulation and willful ignorance of history."

Describing it as "a nauseous, high-calorie sugar rush of a movie that not only wants to have its cake and eat it too, but also to puke it up, smear it around, and cram it in the viewer’s face" in his review for The Ringer, Adam Nayman saw the film as a "deliberately designed career-killer" for Chazelle and praised his direction and ambition alongside the cast performances. Writing less enthusiastically about the film in Variety, Peter Debruge stated that "Babylon presents itself as the apotheosis of all that has come before, the ne plus ultra of the medium's own potential, and indeed, it's an experience that won't be easily topped, in this or any year. But that doesn't make it great or even particularly coherent". 

Richard Brody of The New Yorker praised Chazelle's storytelling and characters, but criticized other aspects of his screenplay, ultimately concluding: "Artistically, what Babylon adds to the classic Hollywood that it celebrates is sex and nudity, drugs and violence, a more diverse cast, and a batch of kitchen-sink chaos that replaces the whys and wherefores of coherent thought with the exhortation to buy a ticket, cast one's eyes up to the screen, and worship in the dark." John Mulderig of The Catholic Review says, "Along the way, Robbie effervesces, Pitt charms and Calva smolders and endures. Yet Chazelle's depiction of Tinseltown's behind-the-scenes decadence takes needless explicitness to the point of obscenity. [He] repeatedly references ...Singin' in the Rain, which unfolds in the same place and time. But comparisons with that beloved classic only highlight the ugliness of his own portrayal of human debasement."

Accolades

See also
Singin' in the Rain: A 1952 musical film that also depicts stars experiencing the transition from silent to sound films (or "talkies"), albeit in a lighthearted tone.
The Artist: A 2011 French black-and-white, partially silent film, also depicting the transition to "talkies", and featuring a "Kinograph" studio resembling the "Kinoscope" of Babylon.
Hollywood Babylon: A 1965 Kenneth Anger book about the dark side of early Hollywood, including the false premise that Clara Bow bedded the entire University of Southern California football team, somewhat as Nellie LaRoy brings that team to a party, and the Roscoe "Fatty" Arbuckle–Virginia Rappe death scandal, resembling Babylons Orville Pickwick–Jane Thornton storyline.
A Clockwork Orange: A 1971 Stanley Kubrick film (with heavy doses of sex, violence and reflection on art, like Babylon) which extensively uses the music from Singin' in the Rain, including in the end credits (compared to Babylons end scene showing Singin' in the Rain), albeit in a much more cynical and sarcastic way than in Babylon.
Once Upon a Time... in Hollywood: A 2019 Quentin Tarantino film which, like Babylon, features not only Brad Pitt as an aging film-industry veteran (fictional stuntman Cliff Booth) facing difficulty with changes in the industry, but also Margot Robbie as an upcoming, celebrated young actress (Sharon Tate) facing dangerous possibilities and people.

References

External links
 
 
 
 
 Official screenplay

2022 films
2022 black comedy films
2022 comedy-drama films
2020s American films
2020s English-language films
2020s historical comedy-drama films
American black comedy films
American epic films
American historical comedy-drama films
Film productions suspended due to the COVID-19 pandemic
Films about actors
Films about film directors and producers
Films about Hollywood, Los Angeles
Films directed by Damien Chazelle
Films produced by Marc E. Platt
Films scored by Justin Hurwitz
Films set in 1926
Films set in 1928
Films set in 1932
Films set in 1952
Films set in studio lots
Films shot in Los Angeles
Films with screenplays by Damien Chazelle
IMAX films
Paramount Pictures films